Moerbeke is a municipality in the Belgian province of East Flanders. The municipality comprises the town of Moerbeke proper, and part of the Dutch-Belgian village Koewacht. In 2021, Moerbeke had a total population of 6,619. The total area is 37.80 km².

Moerbeke was known very well for its sugar refinery.

It is thought to have been the hometown of William of Moerbeke, who as Bishop of Corinth produced a new translation into Latin of the works of Aristotle, including certain which had been rediscovered from Arab sources, in the late 13th century.

Unique is the political situation: since 1847 the liberal party has an absolute majority. The current mayor is Robby De Caluwé. The previous mayor was Filip Marin.

The aldermen are Pierre De Bock, Marc Fruytier, Thierry Walbrecht, Sarah Poppe and Rudy Van Megroot (all Open Vld).

The members of the council are Frederic Dierinck, Inge Mertens, Koen Mertens and Jonas Vandamme for Open Vld, Steven Aper  for N-VA, Lut Vandevijver, Marnik Cooreman and Guido Van Hoecke for CD&V and Etienne Coppens and Chantal Francis for SP.a-Groen ,  Christophe Clerc (formerly N-VA)  and Kristof Van Poucke (formerly N-VA) now both independent

Gallery

References

External links

Official website 
The mayor's website 
Open Vld Moerbeke's website 

 
Municipalities of East Flanders
Waasland
Populated places in East Flanders